The Coongy Cup, registered as the Coongy Handicap, is a Melbourne Racing Club Group 3 Thoroughbred horse race held under open handicap conditions, for horses aged three years old and upwards, over a distance of 2000 metres,  held at Caulfield Racecourse, Melbourne, Australia in October. Total prize money is A$200,000.

History
The race is run on the second day of the MRC Spring Carnival (Caulfield Cup day) and the winner is exempt from ballot in the Caulfield Cup which is run on the third day. Between 1998 and 2018 the race was run on the Caulfield Cup day of the MRC Spring Carnival. 
During World War II the race was run at Flemington Racecourse.

Distance
 1898–1930  –  1 miles (~2200 metres)
 1931–1937  –  the race was not held
 1938–1940  –  1 miles (~2000 metres)
 1941  –  1 miles (~2400 metres)
 1942–1946  –  the race was not held
 1947–1967  –  1 miles (~2400 metres)
 1968–1972  –  1 miles (~2000 metres)
 1973–1996  –  2000 metres
 1997–1998  –  2100 metres
 1999–2002 onwards  –  2000 metres
 2003 – 2020 metres
 2004 onwards –  2000 metres

Grade
 1898–1977 – Principal race
 1978 onwards – Group 3

Name
 1898–2007 – Coongy Handicap
 2008–2015 – David Jones Cup
 2016 onwards - Coongy Cup

Venue
The race was run at Sandown Park Racecourse in 1997 and 1998 on a Sunday.

Winners

 2022 - Gunstock
 2021 - Duais
 2020 - Nonconformist
 2019 - Wolfe
 2018 - † Best Of Days / Mask Of Time
 2017 - Kiwia
 2016 - Vanbrugh
 2015 - Stratum Star
 2014 - Contributor
 2013 – Spurtonic
 2012 – Lighinthenite
 2011 – Foreteller
 2010 – Ginga Dude
 2009 – Baughurst
 2008 – Baughurst
 2007 – Fire In The Night
 2006 – Maybe Better
 2005 – Activation
 2004 – Reclaim
 2003 – Frightening
 2002 – Mr.Lofty
 2001 – Citra's Prince
 2000 – Typhoon
 1999 – Oliver Twist
 1998 – It's All In Fun
 1997 – Our Sumo
 1996 – Circles Of Gold
 1995 – Macdrury
 1994 – Excited Angel
 1993 – Silk Ali
 1992 – Fraar
 1991 – Mantlepiece
 1990 – Kessem
 1989 – Eye Of The Sky
 1988 – Ideal Centreman
 1987 – King Of Brooklyn
 1986 – Periscope
 1985 – Under Oath
 1984 – Lancelotto
 1983 – La Cocotte
 1982 – Rose Of Kingston
 1981 – Our Paddy Boy
 1980 – Yashmak
 1979 – Sonstone
 1978 – La Mer
 1977 – Major Till
 1976 – Northbridge Lad
 1975 – Shiftmar
 1974 – Bellota
 1973 – Top Role
 1972 – Jan's Beau
 1971 – Igloo
 1970 – Lancelot
 1969 – Tails
 1968 – Pealatial
 1967 – Midlander
 1966 – Fulmen
 1965 – Dalento
 1964 – Bon Filou
 1963 – Battle Standard
 1962 – Blue Shaun
 1961 – Grand Print
 1960 – Westdale
 1959 – Contador
 1958 – Red Pine
 1957 – Ralkon
 1956 – Thaumus
 1955 – Ribera
 1954 – †Sunish / Te Totara
 1953 – Winemaker
 1952 – Durham
 1951 – True Course
 1950 – Vantage
 1949 – Hoyle
 1948 – Britisher
 1947 – Red Fury
1942–46 – race not held 
1941 – Son Of Aurous   
1940 – †Lanarus / Morvren  
1939 – Historian   
1938 – Kingdom   
1931–37 – race not held      
1930 – Shadow King   
1929 – Prince Viol   
1928 – Textile   
1927 – Bunkie  
1926 – Naos  
1925 – Valwyne   
1924 – Graculus  
1923 – Stare   
1922 – Paratoo   
1921 – Stare   
1920 – Ulster  
1919 – Kunegetis   
1918 – Camp Out  
1917 – King's Bounty   
1916 – Torbane   
1915 – Cock O' The North   
1914 – Sylvanmore  
1913 – Effervescence   
1912 – Artesian  
1911 – Didus   
1910 – Eye Glass   
1909 – Dhobi   
1908 – Welcome Trist   
1907 – Apologue  
1906 – Demas   
1905 – Scot Free   
1904 – Sylvan King   
1903 – Elderslie   
1902 – Vanity Fair   
1901 – Juggler   
1900 – Clean Sweep   
1899 – Dewey   
1898 – Hymettus  

† Dead heat

See also
 List of Australian Group races
 Group races

References

Horse races in Australia
Open middle distance horse races
Caulfield Racecourse